Kaam is one of the five thieves in Sikhism, described as excessive lust.

See also
Kama, a word with a similar meaning

References
Sexuality and religion
Sikh philosophical concepts